Tamer Şahin (born August 10, 1981 in İzmir, Turkey) is a Turkish white hat hacker.

Overview
Şahin's interest in computers started when he was 13 years old.

Sahin worked on the philosophy of Ethical Hacking and concentrated on institutionalizing his professional life.

He has consulted on various cases concerning cyber security at both national and international level. He used his talent as an Ethical Hacker to detect the vulnerabilities of numerous computer systems and developed defense strategies for some of the leading organizations in the private sector and also public institutions.

The New York Times journalist  and US Cybersecurity and Infrastructure Security Agency advisor Nicole Perlroth, referred in her best seller book "This Is How They Tell Me the World Ends", to Tamer Sahin and described him as "the first person in the world who found and sold a Zero Day vulnerability" He began selling computer vulnerabilities to iDefense shortly after their bug bounty program was established, ultimately selling over 50 bugs and exploits.

After all of these, he has emphasized on his own professional business life and his studies on information security still go on. He has published nearly 50 security announcements on various sources.

His life experience has been handled as projects at Istanbul Technical University, Işık University (Istanbul), Bilkent University (Ankara) and the American Collegiate Institute (Izmir). His studies and social reflections of them have been analysed with documents and presentations as lesson scopes.

Şahin lectures about being a ethical hacker and its philosophy at universities and he gives consultant services to firms (information security contracts stay always confidential) about information security. He wrote about his experiences in the book “Hacker’in Akli” (Eng: Hacker’s Mind), published by "Dogan Kitap". The book made three editions, was on the bestseller list for a month. It is listed in the archives of the Library of Congress Washington DC, Princeton University, Columbia University, Harvard University, Library of Grand National Assembly of Turkey, Patrick Henry College, Salem College, Birmingham-Southern College. He is a graduate of the Faculty of Economics, Department of International Relations.

Media
A documentary film was made by Coskun Aral and his team about Şahin's life and hackers. Şahin writes columns for the technology magazines T3 and Digital Age.

References

External links
 Official website

1981 births
Living people
People associated with computer security
People from İzmir